Thiya Loabeegai Abadhahme Vaanamey is a Maldivian romantic drama television mini-series developed for Television Maldives by Mohamed Manik. The series stars Mohamed Manik, Sheela Najeeb and Nadhiya Hassan in pivotal roles. The series was aired on 13 August 2010 on the occasion of 1431 Ramadan.

Premise
Nadheem (Mohamed Manik) and Shaina (Sheela Najeeb) are a happily married couple blessed with an adorable daughter, Mishka. Nadheem meets a seductive client, Sama (Nadhiya Hassan) who openly confesses her feelings towards Nadheem who expresses similar sentiments though hesitant due to his marital status. Complications arise between Nadheem and Shaina when Sama reveals that she is having an affair with Nadheem.

Cast
 Mohamed Manik as Nadheem
 Sheela Najeeb as Shaina
 Nadhiya Hassan as Sama
 Mahee Mohamed Manik as Mishka
 Furugan as Nadheem's colleague

Soundtrack

References

Serial drama television series
Maldivian television shows